= Kodiya =

- village
- Location within Madhya Pradesh Location within India
- Coordinates: 23.2030238°N 77.2606305°E
- Country: India
- State: Madhya Pradesh
- District: Bhopal
- Tehsil: Huzur
- Elevation: 516 m (1,693 ft)

Population (2011)
  - Total: 1,454
- Time zone: UTC+5:30 (IST)
- ISO 3166 code: MP-IN
- 2011 census code: 482489

Kodiya is a village in the Bhopal district of Madhya Pradesh, India. It is located in the Huzur tehsil and the Phanda block.

== Demographics ==
According to the 2011 census of India, Kodiya has 305 households. The effective literacy rate (i.e. the literacy rate of population excluding children aged 6 and below) is 67.48%.

Demographics (2011 Census)
	Total	Male	Female
Population	1454	738	716
Children aged below 6 years	187	89	98
Scheduled caste	176	87	89
Scheduled tribe	7	4	3
Literates	855	525	330
Workers (all)	506	367	139
Main workers (total)	317	260	57
Main workers: Cultivators	215	185	30
Main workers: Agricultural labourers	30	21	9
Main workers: Household industry workers	14	1	13
Main workers: Other	58	53	5
Marginal workers (total)	189	107	82
Marginal workers: Cultivators	8	3	5
Marginal workers: Agricultural labourers	126	78	48
Marginal workers: Household industry workers	21	7	14
Marginal workers: Others	34	19	15
Non-workers	948	371	577
